The Asian Journal of Applied Linguistics is a bi-annual, peer-reviewed academic journal focused on the field of linguistics, particularly the study and learning of English. The journal was established in 1979 and is published by the Centre for Applied English Studies at the University of Hong Kong.

History
In its current form, the Journal was previously published as the Hong Kong Journal of Applied Linguistics, beginning in 1996. In 2013, the Journal changed its name to the Asian Journal of Applied Linguistics as its scope expanded to include the rest of Asia and reduce the focus on Hong Kong.

Reputation
The Journal is included in the Excellence in Research for Australia Journal List which is compiled by the Australian Government's Research Council.

Accessibility
The journal publishes all material in open access format.

See also
 List of education journals
 Educational psychology

References

External links
 

English-language journals

Publications established in 1979

Language education journals
Biannual journals
University of Hong Kong